Roy Phelix Best (March 2, 1900 – May 27, 1954) was an American prison warden, film actor, and political candidate for Governor of Colorado. He is remembered for his wardenship of the Colorado Territorial Correctional Facility, an infamous prison in Cañon City, Colorado, and for playing himself in Canon City, a 1948 film noir crime film.

Early life
Roy Phelix Best was born on March 2, 1900, in Rocky Ford, Colorado, to parents Boon and Carrie Blakely Best. Colorado Governor William H. Adams appointed Roy's father Boon as warden of the Colorado Territorial Correctional Facility (CTCF) in Canon City. Adams later appointed Roy as warden of the same facility, making them the first father and son appointed warden by the same governor.

Wardenship
Governor Adams appointed Best as warden at CTCF in 1932, when Best was 32 years old. This made Best the youngest warden in the history of the state and federal prison systems at that time. 

Best wasted no time earning his reputation as “the most notorious” warden in Colorado history. A strict disciplinarian, Best pioneered the use of painful and degrading punishments inside and outside prison walls. Among these was the “Old Gray Mare,” a wooden sawhorse on which inmates were bent-over, tied-down, and “flogged with a leather strap.” Although Best used the “Mare” as a means of punishment and deterrence, the device would later play a central role in the controversy that led to his removal.

Homosexual prisoners also were unspared. Early in Best's tenure, male prisoners caught in amorous liaisons “were forced to wear dresses and push a wheelbarrow filled with rocks as their punishment.” A 1935 photograph documents the practice. 

But Best also pioneered modern rehabilitative penological practices. He opened ranches, workshops, gardens, and other facilities to keep inmates busy, provide them with skills to earn a living upon release, and reduce the prison's operating costs. Best also separated female prisoners from dangerous males, implemented a dental care program, and took young and developmentally-disabled inmates, like Joe Arridy, under his wing.

Best's defenders preferred to focus on these rehabilitative efforts. “Many were led to believe that [Best] was unduly harsh and inhumane,” wrote The Steamboat Pilot upon his death, “[b]ut for those who knew him…he was an efficient operator of an institution that was difficult to handle.”

Film career
A prison break in 1947 was among the difficulties that confronted Best during his controversial tenure. On December 30, 1947, twelve inmates escaped Best's prison in the middle of a snowstorm just before New Year's Eve. Best organized a search party, and successfully captured or killed all of the escapees, “with most of the survivors suffering some degree of frostbite.” 

Hollywood wasted no time capitalizing on the dramatic events. Just months later, director Crane Wilbur, actors Scott Brady, Jeff Corey, and Whit Bissell, and a film crew arrived at Best's prison gates to recreate the escape for the silver screen. The result was Canon City, a film noir crime film shot almost entirely on location and in the Royal Gorge area.

Best played himself in the film. Throughout the film, Best can be seen inspecting the prison, explaining his duties, and coordinating the search efforts—all while wearing his Stetson, with his two Dobermans, Chris and Ike, by his side. The New York Times effusively praised Best's acting skills, writing that his performance evoked “a naturalness few actors could stimulate.”

Political career
Even before the release of Canon City, Best was quick to capitalize on his newfound notoriety as warden of Colorado's state penitentiary. Best ran unopposed in the 1944 Democratic Primary for Governor of Colorado, earning over 34,000 votes. He proceeded to narrowly lose to Republican John Charles Vivian in the 1944 Colorado gubernatorial election.

Controversy and death
By the early 1950s, word of Best's floggings had reached the public and spurred significant backlash. In response, Governor Daniel I. J. Thornton launched an investigation and called for Best's removal. A federal indictment followed, and Best faced a trial for violating his prisoners’ constitutional rights, among other charges.

Although the jury ultimately acquitted Best, the attention spurred a separate civil service inquest, which found that Best mixed his personal financial affairs with those of the prison. He received a two-year suspension from his wardenship of two decades.

Best died from a heart attack on May 27, 1954, just three days short of the lifting of his suspension, and was buried at Lakeside Cemetery in Cañon City, just two miles from the prison.

Legacy
Best's life remains controversial. Supporters remembered him as a “kindly man” who “took charge of the penitentiary when it was in a state of chaos.” “When prisoners were whipped,” they wrote, “he did not ask someone else to do it. He did the job himself.”

Others criticize his brutal floggings of prisoners, humiliation of homosexuals, financial misdeeds, and relentless self-promotion.

Regardless, Roy Best's influences remain in the culture of prisons and jails in the United States. Gardens and employment training remain in place to encourage good behavior and prepare inmates for the outside world. The film Canon City remains a cult classic. And each year, thousands of visitors learn from Roy Best's complicated legacy at the Colorado Prison Museum and elsewhere.

“Because of the many attacks against him,” read Best's obituary, “many were led to believe he was unduly harsh and inhumane.” “But for those who knew him,” the obituary continued, “they had a far different opinion.”

Notes

References 

1900 births
1954 deaths
American prison wardens
Colorado Democrats
20th-century American male actors
People from Rocky Ford, Colorado